The 2005 Hungarian Figure Skating Championships took place between January 8 and 9, 2004 in Budapest. Skaters competed in the disciplines of men's singles, ladies' singles, and ice dancing on the senior and junior levels. The results were used to choose the Hungarian teams to the 2005 World Championships and the 2005 European Championships.

Results

Men

Ladies

Ice dancing

External links
 results

Hungarian Figure Skating Championships
Hungarian Figure Skating Championships, 2005
Figure skating